Glenburn is a locality in Victoria, Australia. It is in the local government area of the Shire of Murrindindi. At the 2016 census, Glenburn had a population of 415.

The Post Office opened in 1902 and was known as Glenburn Creamery until 1907.

References

Towns in Victoria (Australia)
Shire of Murrindindi